Owen Diana Omogiafo (born 28 May 1980) is a Nigerian business executive and strategist. She is the President and Group Chief Executive Officer of Transnational Corporation of Nigeria (Transcorp), a diversified conglomerate with strategic investments in the Power, Hospitality and Oil and Gas sectors.

Early life and education 
Owen Omogiafo was born on 28 May 1980, Benin City, Edo State, Nigeria. She attended the University of Benin, where she earned a Bachelor’s degree (double honours) in Sociology and Anthropology. She holds a Master of Science degree in Human Resource Management from the London School of Economics and Political Science and is an alumnus of the Lagos Business School and IESE Business School, Spain. 
 
She is a member of the Chartered Institute of Personnel and Development, UK and a Certified Change Manager with the Prosci Institute, USA. She is a member of the Institute of Directors (IoD) Nigeria.

Career
Owen has worked in diverse roles including as Director of Human Resources at Heirs Holdings, Chief of Staff, Human Resource Advisor to the GMD/CEO at United Bank for Africa (UBA) and as an Organisation and Human Performance Consultant at Accenture, specializing in Change Management. .

Early career
Owen’s early career commenced in Stockbroking and later, she moved to Banking where she held various roles spanning Operations, Service Quality Management and Relationship Management. Prior to joining UBA, she worked with Accenture where she covered various projects and clients spanning the Private and Public sectors and diverse industries.

Heirs Holdings Limited and Tony Elumelu Foundation 
As a staff of Heirs Holdings, Owen served in various capacities including as the Director of Resources, responsible for establishing structures for optimal man and machine engagement and deployment within Heirs Holdings Group. She equally served as the Chief Operating Officer at the Tony Elumelu Foundation (TEF), where, working with the CEO and the Board, she oversaw the $100m Programme aimed at identifying, mentoring, and funding 10,000 entrepreneurs over 10 years.

Transnational Corporation of Nigeria Plc (Transcorp) 
She joined Transcorp as the Executive Director, Corporate Services in July 2018, and was later appointed as the Managing Director and Chief Executive Officer of Transcorp Hotels Plc, leading the brand's operation of its flagship Transcorp Hilton Abuja and Transcorp Hotels Calabar.

In March 2020, she was announced as the President/Chief Executive Officer of Transcorp after her appointment to the role, she became the youngest t CEO on the Nigerian Stock Exchange and also the youngest and first female to occupy the position at Transcorp.

Owen is a member of the Board of Trustees of the Association of Power Generation Companies (APGC) in Nigeria, an association for power generation companies representing the interests of developers and operators of independent energy facilities. She holds Non-Executive Director positions in various companies including Transcorp Power Limited, Transcorp Hotels Plc and Avon Healthcare Limited, where she sits on the Board’s Finance, Investment & Risk Committee, and Audit & Governance Committee.

Personal life 
Owen is married to Osato Omogiafo and they have three children.

Honors 
She has received several awards and recognition including:
Business Day (Nigeria) Women’s Hub – 50 Most Inspiring Nigerian Women
Leading Ladies Africa - 50 Leading Ladies in Corporate Nigeria
YNaija - Power List for Corporate Nigeria 2018

References

21st-century Nigerian businesspeople
Nigerian chief executives
Nigerian women business executives
Businesspeople from Lagos
Alumni of the London School of Economics
1980 births
Living people
Residents of Lagos
University of Benin (Nigeria) alumni
Nigerian corporate directors
Lagos Business School alumni
University of Navarra alumni